In geometry, a triakis tetrahedron (or kistetrahedron) is a Catalan solid with 12 faces. Each Catalan solid is the dual of an Archimedean solid. The dual of the triakis tetrahedron is the truncated tetrahedron.

The triakis tetrahedron can be seen as a tetrahedron with a triangular pyramid added to each face; that is, it is the Kleetope of the tetrahedron. It is very similar to the net for the 5-cell, as the net for a tetrahedron is a triangle with other triangles added to each edge, the net for the 5-cell a tetrahedron with  pyramids attached to each face. This interpretation is expressed in the name.

The length of the shorter edges is  that of the longer edges. If the triakis tetrahedron has shorter edge length 1, it has area  and volume .

Cartesian coordinates 

Cartesian coordinates for the 8 vertices of a triakis tetrahedron centered at the origin, are the points (±, ±, ±) with an even number of minus signs, along with the points (±1, ±1, ±1) with an odd number of minus signs:
(), (−, −), (−, −), (−, −)
(−1, 1, 1), (1, −1, 1), (1, 1, −1), (−1, −1, −1)

The length of the shorter edges of this triakis tetrahedron equals 2. The faces are isosceles triangles with one obtuse and two acute angles. The obtuse angle equals arccos(–) ≈  ° and the acute ones equal arccos() ≈ °.

Tetartoid symmetry 
The triakis tetrahedron can be made as a degenerate limit of a tetartoid:

Orthogonal projections

Variations
A triakis tetrahedron with equilateral triangle faces represents a net of the four-dimensional regular polytope known as the 5-cell.

If the triangles are right-angled isosceles, the faces will be coplanar and form a cubic volume. This can be seen by adding the 6 edges of tetrahedron inside of a cube.

Stellations

This chiral figure is one of thirteen stellations allowed by Miller's rules.

Related polyhedra 

The triakis tetrahedron is a part of a sequence of polyhedra and tilings, extending into the hyperbolic plane. These face-transitive figures have (*n32) reflectional symmetry.

See also
Truncated triakis tetrahedron

References

 (Section 3-9)
 (The thirteen semiregular convex polyhedra and their duals, Page 14, Triakistetrahedron)
The Symmetries of Things 2008, John H. Conway, Heidi Burgiel, Chaim Goodman-Strass,   (Chapter 21, Naming the Archimedean and Catalan polyhedra and tilings, page 284, Triakis tetrahedron )

External links

Catalan solids